, there are 34 conservation areas in the city of Brighton and Hove, a seaside resort on the English Channel coast in southeast England.  The definition of a conservation area is a principally urban area "of special architectural or historic interest, the character or appearance of which it is desirable to preserve or enhance". Such areas are identified according to criteria defined by Sections 69 and 70 of the Planning (Listed Buildings and Conservation Areas) Act 1990.  Brighton and Hove City Council is responsible for creating conservation areas within the city, and expands upon the statutory definition by stating that each area has "high townscape quality [and] its own distinctive character [... which] creates a sense of place".

The city has existed in its present form only since 2000, when Queen Elizabeth II granted city status to the unitary authority of Brighton and Hove, which was in turn created in 1997 by the amalgamation of Brighton and Hove Borough Councils. Before 1997, the two councils were separately responsible for creating and administering conservation areas.  Hove Borough Council designated the first two, in 1969: Charles Busby's expansive self-contained Brunswick Town estate, with a twin-terrace centrepiece "as grand as anything in St Petersburg", and the rapidly developed mid-19th-century suburb of Cliftonville, characterised by Italianate villas and large Tudorbethan houses. The following year, Brighton Borough Council set up conservation areas to preserve and improve the historic centres of five ancient downland villages—Ovingdean, Patcham, Preston, Rottingdean and Stanmer—which became part of the urban area in 1928 and 1952 because of boundary changes.  Brighton's own architectural set-piece, Thomas Read Kemp's "striking, [...] graceful and imposing" Kemp Town estate of the mid-1820s, by Busby and Amon Wilds, was designated at the same time.

Many more parts of the urban area have been included in conservation areas in subsequent years, either through the creation of new areas or by means of extensions to existing areas. One conservation area, Preston, was split into two (Preston Park and Preston Village) in 1988 after it had been extended several times. In 2004, when Carlton Hill had not yet been designated, the proportion of Brighton and Hove's urban area covered by conservation areas was about 18%.

The city's conservation areas vary in character and size.  Stanmer—an isolated, rural country estate with a mansion, church and single-street village— is more than 200 times larger than the conservation area surrounding the similarly rural Benfield Barn, on the South Downs above Hangleton.  Brunswick Town and Kemp Town, by Busby and Wilds, are famous, high-class 19th-century planned estates, each with dozens of listed buildings (including many at the highest Grade I); each represents "the pinnacle of [their] work and ... considerable achievements in domestic architecture and town design". In contrast, areas such as Sackville Gardens and Cliftonville are small-scale, piecemeal suburban developments with varied architectural styles and few or no listed buildings. Woodland Drive and Tongdean have large 20th-century houses, while the Engineerium conservation area consists of formerly industrial buildings.

The government encourages but does not require local authorities to produce studies appraising the character of conservation areas. As of 2017, two of Brighton and Hove's areas lacked formal appraisal documents. The corresponding figure in 2004, when the city's conservation strategy was last revised, was 11.

Conservation areas

Extensions and changes

Section 69 of the Planning (Listed Buildings and Conservation Areas) Act 1990 requires local authorities not only to decide upon and designate conservation areas, but also to review their boundaries periodically. Furthermore, Brighton's Borough Plan (adopted in 1995) states that "consideration will be given to the inclusion of additional areas within existing conservation areas", and that "the opportunity to review the boundaries further will be taken when detailed plans for each conservation area are produced".

Many conservation areas have been extended since they were originally designated.  The first round of expansions came in 1977, when Brighton Borough Council changed the boundaries of East Cliff, Kemp Town, the Old Town, Queen's Park, Regency Square and Valley Gardens. East Cliff had a further three extensions: in 1989, 1991 and 2002.  The North Laine and neighbouring Valley Gardens areas were each extended in 1989 and 1995; Valley Gardens had already had a boundary change in 1988.  More was added to Regency Square's area in 2005, to Patcham in 1992, and to West Hill in 1995.  As originally created in 1970, Stanmer conservation area covered only Stanmer House, the village and its environs.  An extension in 1988 added much of the surrounding parkland, and more land was added in 2010.

Preston is the only instance of a conservation area being split.  Designated under that name in 1970, it was expanded in 1977, 1980 and 1981; in 1988, Brighton Borough Council decided to create two new areas, Preston Village and Preston Park, from this territory. The latter in turn expanded in 1995. A different approach was taken at Montpelier & Clifton Hill: until 2005 this conservation area was named "Clifton", but the council acknowledged that it covered territory in the Montpelier area of the city by introducing its present name in 2005.

Conservation areas are occasionally extended to include single buildings which contribute significantly to an area's character.  West Hill, whose residential development immediately followed the opening of Brighton railway station at the bottom of the hill in 1840, changed its boundaries to include it in 1988. The East Cliff conservation area's northern boundary is Eastern Road, but in 2010 consideration was given to extending it north of this at Upper Bedford Street to incorporate Thomas Lainson's Grade II-listed Pelham Institute, a High Victorian Gothic building of the 1870s, and the neighbouring Fitzherbert Centre—a disused early-20th-century school.

See also
Buildings and architecture of Brighton and Hove

Map

References

Notes

Bibliography

Brighton and Hove-related lists
Brighton and Hove conservation areas
Brighton and Hove